Marycrest may refer to:

Marycrest Girls High School, Denver, Colorado
Marycrest College Historic District, Davenport, Iowa